The 1989 Lufthansa Cup was a women's tennis tournament played on outdoor clay courts at the Rot-Weiss Tennis Club in West Berlin, West Germany that was part of the Category 5 tier of the 1989 WTA Tour. It was the 20th edition of the tournament and was held from 15 May until 21 May 1989. First-seeded Steffi Graf won the singles title.

Finals

Singles

 Steffi Graf defeated  Gabriela Sabatini 6–3, 6–1
 It was Graf's 7th singles title of the year and the 37th of her career.

Doubles

 Elizabeth Smylie /  Janine Tremelling defeated  Lise Gregory /  Gretchen Magers 5–7, 6–3, 6–2
 It was Smylie's 5th title of the year and the 26th of her career. It was Tremelling's 3rd title of the year and the 5th of her career.

External links
 ITF tournament edition details
 Tournament draws

Lufthansa Cup
WTA German Open
1989 in German tennis